Nagata is a surname which can be either of Japanese (written: 永田 or 長田) or Fijian origin. Notable people with the surname include:

Akira Nagata (born 1985), Japanese vocalist and actor
Alipate Nagata, Fijian politician
Anna Nagata (born 1982), Japanese actress
Apisai Nagata, Fijian rugby union footballer
Hidejirō Nagata (1876–1943), politician and cabinet minister in the Empire of Japan
Hideo Nagata (1885–1949), Japanese poet and playwright
Hiroko Nagata (1945–2011), Japanese leftist radical
Hiroshi Nagata (born 1907), Japanese field hockey player
Hisayasu Nagata (1969–2009), Japanese politician
Hisayoshi Nagata (born 1962), Japanese former water polo player
Jun-iti Nagata (1925–2007), Japanese mathematician
Katsuhiko Nagata (born 1973), Japanese Olympic wrestler and mixed martial artist
Kazuhiko Nagata (born 1964), Japanese engineer, driver, and entrepreneur (Top Secret) 
Linda Nagata (born 1960), American science fiction author
Masaichi Nagata (1906–1985), Japanese film producer and baseball executive
Masayoshi Nagata (1927–2008), Japanese mathematician
Michael K. Nagata, U.S. Army officer
Mikihiko Nagata (1887-1964), Japanese poet and playwright
Mitsuru Nagata (born 1983), Japanese football player
, Japanese women's basketball player
Mutsuko Nagata (born 1976), Japanese former basketball player
Nanae Nagata (1956–2009), Japanese long-distance runner
Reina Nagata (born 1992), Japanese beauty pageant
Ryōko Nagata (born 1975), Japanese voice actress
Ryota Nagata (born 1985), Japanese football player
Ryuji Nagata (born 1972), former Japanese football player
Shigekazu Nagata (born 1949), Japanese molecular biologist
Shiori Nagata (born 1987), Japanese handball player
Takashi Nagata (born 1972), former Japanese football player
Takeshi Nagata (1913–1991), Japanese geophysicist
Takuya Nagata (born 1990), Japanese football defender
Takuya Nagata (born 1994), Japanese athlete
Tetsuo Nagata (born 1952), Japanese cinematographer
Tetsuzan Nagata (1884–1935), Japanese soldier and politician
, Japanese bobsledder
Yasujiro Nagata (1867–1923) Imperial Japanese Navy admiral
, Japanese boxer
Yuji Nagata (born 1968), Japanese professional wrestler

See also
Nagatachō, Tokyo, district in Tokyo's Chiyoda Ward

Japanese-language surnames
Fijian-language surnames